"If Heaven" is a song written and recorded by Gretchen Peters on her 2004 album, Halcyon. Shortly thereafter, American country music singer Andy Griggs recorded his version. Griggs' version was released in October 2004 as the second single from his album This I Gotta See. Griggs' eleventh single on the Billboard country singles charts, it is also the final Top 40 country hit of his career, peaking at number 5 in mid-2005.

Content
Written by Gretchen Peters, "If Heaven" is a ballad in which the narrator offers up possible images of Heaven, each based on an idealized moment of everyday life, such as "If heaven was an hour, it would be twilight". In the chorus, he sings, "If that's what heaven's made of / You know, I ain't afraid to die."

Griggs said that he was emotionally moved by the song, which made him recall his father and brother, both of whom died during Griggs' childhood. His mother has asked him to perform the song for her, and refers to it as "the song."

Critical reception
Deborah Evans Price, of Billboard magazine reviewed the song favorably, calling it "one of those beautiful, understated ballads that will have listeners heaving a thoughtful sigh." She goes on to say that Griggs' "warm, muscular baritone gently breathes life into each line, evoking emotions both sad and hopeful."

Music video
The music video was directed by Roman White and premiered in 2005.

Chart performance
"If Heaven" debuted at number 59 on the U.S. Billboard Hot Country Singles & Tracks for the week of October 16, 2004.

Year-end charts

References

2004 singles
Andy Griggs songs
Songs written by Gretchen Peters
Music videos directed by Roman White
RCA Records Nashville singles
1984 songs